The 14th Biathlon World Championships were held in 1975 in Antholz-Anterselva, Italy.

Men's results

20 km individual

10 km sprint

4 × 7.5 km relay

Medal table

References

1975
Biathlon World Championships
International sports competitions hosted by Italy
1975 in Italian sport
February 1975 sports events in Europe
Biathlon competitions in Italy
Sport in South Tyrol